is a prefectural museum in Yamaguchi, Japan, dedicated to the natural history and history of Yamaguchi Prefecture. It also has displays relating to science, technology, and astronomy. The museum opened as the Bōchō Educational Museum in 1912 and moved to its present location in 1917, reopening as the Yamaguchi Prefectural Educational Museum. The current building dates to 1967. The museum celebrated its one hundredth anniversary in 2012.

See also
 List of Historic Sites of Japan (Yamaguchi)
 Yamaguchi Prefectural Art Museum
 Suō Province
 Nagato Province

References

External links

 Yamaguchi Prefectural Museum
  Yamaguchi Prefectural Museum

Museums in Yamaguchi Prefecture
Yamaguchi (city)
History museums in Japan
Prefectural museums
Museums established in 1912
1912 establishments in Japan